San Pietro Somaldi is a Gothic- style,  Roman Catholic church located on a Piazza of the same name, near the location of the old medieval walls, in central Lucca, region of Tuscany, Italy.

History
A Lombard church, it was named in part after a bishop Sumualdo or Summal, who founded the church in 763. It was once property of the Lombard king Aistulf. Reconstruction of a new church started in the 12th-century, and was not complete until 14th-centuries.

The central portal has a sculpted relief depicting St Paul gaining keys (1248) by Guido Bigarelli of Como.

References

Roman Catholic churches in Lucca
Gothic architecture in Lucca
14th-century Roman Catholic church buildings in Italy